Flexure may refer to:

 Flexure, a flexible element (or combination of elements) engineered to be compliant in specific degrees of freedom.
 Bending, the behavior of a structural element subjected to a lateral load
 Flexure bearing, a type of flexure designed to be compliant in a bending or rotation degree of freedom, providing functionality similar to a bearing or hinge
 The small distortion of an astronomical instrument caused by the weight of its parts; the amount to be added or subtracted from the observed readings of the instrument to correct them for this distortion
 Curvature, the deviation from straightness
 Flexure (embryology) an early bending of the neural tube

See also
 Living hinge
 
 Bend (disambiguation)
 Flexion (disambiguation)